Bolteniopsis is a genus of ascidian tunicates in the family Pyuridae.

Species within the genus Bolteniopsis include:
 Bolteniopsis pacificus Monniot, 1989 
 Bolteniopsis perlucidus Monniot & Monniot, 1985 
 Bolteniopsis prenanti Harant, 1927 
 Bolteniopsis sessilis Monniot C. & Monniot F., 1970

References

Stolidobranchia
Tunicate genera